Gymnopternus pseudodebilis is a species of long-legged fly in the family Dolichopodidae.

References

Dolichopodinae
Articles created by Qbugbot
Insects described in 1964
Taxa named by Harold E. Robinson